Auchenipterichthys punctatus is a species of driftwood catfish endemic to Brazil where it is found in the upper Amazon River basin.  It grows to a length of 15.1 cm.

References 

 

Auchenipteridae
Fish described in 1840
Endemic fauna of Brazil